The Free routine combination competition of the Synchronised swimming events at the 2011 World Aquatics Championships was held on July 19 with the preliminary round and the final on 21 July.

Medalists

Results
The preliminary round was held on July 19. The final was held on July 21.

Green denotes finalists

References

External links
2011 World Aquatics Championships: Free routine combination start list, from OmegaTiming.com; retrieved 2011-07-18.

Free routine combination